Alan Burton (born 22 February 1991) is an English semi-professional footballer who plays as a midfielder.

Career
Born in Blackpool, Burton played youth football with Accrington Stanley, and joined Evo-Stik League Premier Division club Marine on loan in September 2009, scoring 2 goals in 13 appearances. He became the first player to sign up after the transfer embargo placed on Accrington Stanley was lifted.

Burton had a second spell on loan at Marine in February 2011.

He made his debut for Accrington Stanley in the Football League on 7 May 2011, playing the full 90 minutes against Burton Albion. In May 2012, Burton was released from Accrington after being told his contract would not be renewed.

He re-signed for Marine on a permanent contract in August 2012, before moving to Skelmersdale United in June 2013. He returned to Marine in November 2015. He was released by the club in August 2017.

References

1991 births
Living people
English footballers
Accrington Stanley F.C. players
Marine F.C. players
Skelmersdale United F.C. players
English Football League players
Sportspeople from Blackpool
Association football midfielders